is a national highway of Japan that traverses the prefecture of Niigata in a southwest–northeast routing. It connects the city of Kashiwazaki in south-central Niigata Prefecture to the prefecture's capital city, Niigata, to the north along the Sea of Japan coastline.

Route description
National Route 116 mainly functions as an alternative route to National Route 8 and the Hokuriku Expressway between the cities of Kashiwazaki and Niigata. It runs closer to the coastline of the Sea of Japan, while the aforementioned highways take a more inland route. It also takes a more rural route between Kashiwazaki and Niigata. While National Route 8 travels through the center of the cities Nagaoka, Mitsuke, and Sanjō, National Route 116 passes only through the center of the city of Tsubame. A  section of the highway in Niigata makes up the southernmost section of the Niigata Bypass, a limited-access road that travels along the eastern edge of the city's center.

History

National Route 116 was established by the Cabinet of Japan on 18 May 1954 as Secondary National Route 116 between the cities of Kashiwazaki and Niigata. The highway was reclassified as General National Route 116 on 1 April 1965. The highway was heavily damaged in Kashiwazaki during the 2007 Chūetsu offshore earthquake. Several sections of the roadway collapsed or were displaced during the earthquake; however, local authorities were able to repair the damage by the end of the day after the earthquake. On 1 April 2008, the highway's route through Niigata was shifted onto the limited-access Niigata Bypass.

Major junctions
The route lies entirely within Niigata Prefecture.

See also

References

External links

116
Roads in Niigata Prefecture